The Suzuki XN85, released in early 1983, was a turbocharged motorcycle designed as a sports bike. The name came from the claim that it produced 85 bhp, although rear wheel measurements were in the low 70s. It featured the first factory 16-inch front wheel (at least in the U.S.), previously seen only on race bikes. It also had low clip-on handlebars, rearset foot pegs, four-into-one exhaust, electronic fuel injection, and a monoshock rear suspension called the Suzuki Full Floater—the first to feature this. Its styling was derived from the Suzuki Katana. 

The engine was rather tame, with boost kicking in around 5,000 rpm. The fuel-injected motor pulled strongly from that point but did not match the performance of larger sportbikes. Oil jets directed onto the bottom of the pistons improved engine cooling. Later iterations of this technique were marketed as the Suzuki Advanced Cooling System. While the XN did not have the power of other sportbikes, it had notably better handling than similar powered machines due to frame and suspension geometry. Total XN85 production was 1,153 units from 1983 to 1985. Three hundred of those were exported to the U.S, where the bike was sold only in 1983.

The XN85 was replaced shortly after its release in the U.S. by the lighter and cheaper GS750ES.

See also
   
Turbochargers in motorcycles

References

External links
 1983 XN85D specs at turbomotorcyles.org

XN85

Motorcycles introduced in 1983